Keith Powers (born November 16, 1983) is an American politician, Democrat, and council member for the 4th district of the New York City Council. He succeeded former council member Daniel Garodnick in 2018, and was appointed Majority Leader in 2022.

The district includes the Upper East Side, Central Park South, Grand Central Terminal, Tudor City, Waterside, Peter Cooper Village, Carnegie Hill, Stuyvesant Town, the United Nations as well as part of Yorkville and Turtle Bay in Manhattan.

Life and career
Powers attended The Epiphany School and St. Francis Preparatory School, both Catholic schools. He received his B.A. in political science from the University of Dayton in 2005 and his M.A. in political science from the City College of New York Graduate Center in 2013.

From November 2006 to January 2011, Powers served as the chief of staff for New York State Assembly member Johnathan Bing. He was the campaign manager for New York State Senator Liz Krueger during her 2006 campaign. Since January 2011 Powers has served as the chair of the Business Affairs Committee of Community Board 6. From January 2011 to the start of his campaign in April 2017, he was the vice president of Constantinople & Vallone Consulting, a government relations consulting firm.

On September 12, 2017, he won the Democratic nomination for New York City Council District 4. He won the November 7 general election and took the place of Councilman Dan Garodnick on January 1, 2018.

In January 2019, he was ranked first (tied with Helen Rosenthal) as top lawmaker on New York City Council by City and State.

Electoral history 
Powers won the Democratic primary for District 4 in 2017 with 40.83% of the vote. He went on to win the general election with 57.44% of the vote, against Republican Party candidate Rebecca Harary and Liberal Party candidate Rachel Honig.

References

External links

Living people
New York City Council members
New York (state) Democrats
21st-century American politicians
University of Dayton alumni
City College of New York alumni
1983 births
Politicians from Manhattan